William Marks may refer to:

William Marks (politician) (1778–1858), American lawyer, U.S. Senator for Pennsylvania
William Marks (Latter Day Saints) (1792–1872), American early religious leader in the Latter Day Saint movement
William J. Marks, spokesperson for the U.S. Defense Intelligence Agency